The Tough Ones (lit. "Rome at gunpoint", also known as Rome, Armed to the Teeth) is a 1976 Italian poliziottesco film directed by Umberto Lenzi and first entry into the Tanzi/Moretto/Monnezza shared universe
.

Plot
Inspector Leonardo Tanzi, the head of the anti-gang squad of the Roman branch of the Italian State Police, is pursuing Emmanuel Dominique Ferrender, a French gangster who holds a monopoly on criminal activity within Rome. A raid at a casino that Ferrender is reported to operate proves fruitless until Savelli, a one-armed criminal with ties to Ferrender, walks by the establishment. Tanzi and his partner, Inspector Francesco Caputo, arrest Savelli but are forced to release him without charge; he later kills a guard during a bank robbery.

To find Savelli, Tanzi and another colleague, Poliani, question Savelli's hunchbacked brother-in-law Vincenzo Moretto during his work at a slaughterhouse, but he refuses to cooperate. To arrest him, Tanzi plants drugs in Moretto's Porsche, allowing him and Poliani to interrogate him, where he still refuses to answer their questions. While using the bathroom, Moretto cuts his wrist using his watch's armband, requiring him to be hospitalized; fearing a public scandal concerning police brutality, Vice-Commissioner Ruini has Moretto released without charge and transfers Tanzi to the licenses and permits department.

Three of Moretto's friends avenge him by kidnapping Tanzi's girlfriend Anna, a juvenile court magistrate, and take her to a junkyard, where they intimidate her by pretending to leave her to be crushed to death by the machinery and give her a bullet to present to Tanzi as a warning. Traumatized, Anna is unable to identify the culprits to Tazni, but he realizes Moretto's involvement due to the bullet and confronts him, ordering to swallow the bullet in a show of force. Sometime later, Tanzi helps Caputo exhume a decaying body found in Castelfusano, which he suspects is connected to Ferrender.

Maria Assante, the widow of a deceased colleague of Tanzi's, asks him to investigate the whereabouts of her teenage daughter Marta, who has fallen into an abusive relationship with drug dealer Tony Parenzo. When Tanzi attempts to confront Tony in his apartment, he attempts to escape with Marta, who is too sick to comply, forcing him to kill her with an overdose of heroin; Tanzi gives chase, but Tony escapes after taking hostages. Having recovered from her ordeal and disillusioned with her career, Anna decides to temporarily live in Milan with relatives, which Tanzi agrees may be beneficial for their relationship. While helping her move out, Tanzi notices Tony on the street and savagely beats him. To avoid further punishment, Tony attempts to convey key information about Ferrender, but he is shot dead by Moretto from a car driven by his friend Albino; they drive away just as Caputo and Anna arrive. When Albino asks Moretto why he did not kill Tanzi, he reveals that he intends to kill him in a direct confrontation by using the bullet he was forced to swallow.

Tanzi threatens to resign from the force when Ruini insinuates that he may have been Tony's killer, but they are interrupted when Savelli and two of Moretto's friends hold up a bank. Tanzi and a marksman infiltrate the bank through its air conditioning ducts and kill the gangsters without harming the hostages. Impressed by Tanzi, Ruini allows him to pursue Moretto, who commandeers an ambulance to escape the police, killing several bystanders in the process. Anna identifies her kidnappers as Savelli's accomplices and Albino, and that the junkyard they took her to was at the edge of town. Tanzi soon discovers that the junkyard was once owned by Ferdinando Gerace, a businessman he had previously argued with over a lost license and encountered during his search for Marta, determining that he is a middleman between Ferrender and Moretto's gang.

Meeting at Gerace's warehouse, Moretto and Albino divide the ransom from a prominent jeweller they had kidnapped with Gerace and his men. Tanzi, Caputo and Poliani arrest Gerace; when Tanzi confronts Albino, he is disarmed and beaten by Moretto, who gloats that the corpse found in Castelfusano was that of Ferrender, who he had killed several weeks prior. Moretto kills Caputo with Tanzi's sidearm and flees, prompting Tanzi to use Caputo's gun to shoot him dead.

Cast
Maurizio Merli: Inspector Leonardo Tanzi
Tomas Milian: Vincenzo Moretto, "The Hunchback"
Arthur Kennedy: Vice-Commissioner Ruini
Giampiero Albertini: Inspector Francesco Caputo
Maria Rosaria Omaggio: Anna
Ivan Rassimov: Tony Parenzo
Biagio Pelligra: Savelli
Aldo Barberito: Detective Poliani
Stefano Patrizi: Stefano
Luciano Catenacci: Ferdinando Gerace 
Luciano Pigozzi: Savelli's Henchman

Production
Director Umberto Lenzi was offered a script titled Roma ha un segreto ("Rome Has a Secret"), a spy story set in the popular Roman district Trastevere. Lenzi felt that the script made no sense and discarded it. He then asked the producer to make a film about the violence that was surrounding Rome at the time. Within a week, Lenzi improvised a script.

Release
The Tough Ones was released on February 25, 1976 in Italy, where it was distributed by Medusa Distribuzione. The film grossed 1,617,361,000 Italian lira. It was followed by a sequel, The Cynic, the Rat and the Fist, the following year.

In the United States, the film was re-titled Brutal Justice and was released on the grindhouse circuit by Aquarius Releasing. For this version, Aquarius founder Terry Levene was responsible for replacing several establishing shots in the film with English-language counterparts filmed around New York City. A second version, also released on VHS, was released by Aquarius under the title Assault with a Deadly Weapon, which featured a new title sequence featuring a skull-faced police officer and credits for non-existent cast and crew members. Film historian Roberto Curti criticized the latter version for being "badly-cut".

The Tough Ones was released uncut and under its original English title on Blu-ray by Grindhouse Releasing in 2019.

See also 

 List of Italian films of 1976

Footnotes

References

External links

1970s Italian-language films
Police detective films
1976 crime films
Poliziotteschi films
1976 films
Films directed by Umberto Lenzi
Films scored by Franco Micalizzi
Films set in Rome
1970s Italian films